Xinghua Township is a township of Liangdang County in southeastern Gansu province, China, located  southeast of the county seat and  west of the border with Shaanxi. , it has 10 villages under its administration.

See also 
 List of township-level divisions of Gansu

References 

Township-level divisions of Gansu